Fenris (Andrea von Strucker and Andreas von Strucker) are two fictional characters appearing in American comic books published by Marvel Comics. They are the German twin children of supervillain Baron Strucker of HYDRA and the half-siblings of Werner von Strucker.

The two characters appear in The Gifted.

Publication history
Created by Chris Claremont and John Romita Jr., the von Strucker twins first appeared in Uncanny X-Men #194 (June 1985) in their civilian identity and in Uncanny X-Men #200 (December 1985) as Fenris.

Fictional character biography
Andrea and Andreas are the children of the terrorist organization HYDRA leader Baron Wolfgang von Strucker. While the two were still in their mother's uterus, they were genetically modified, which gave them bio-energy powers which they can use when in physical contact with one another (usually when holding hands). Strucker indoctrinated his children in the beliefs of white supremacy, Nazism and the Fourth Reich. In adulthood, the twins became the supervillains known as "Fenris" and led the Fenris terrorist organization.

Like their father, they are white supremacists. The Strucker twins have gone up against Storm when Storm interrupts Andreas's attempted assault on a native woman in Africa. Andrea retaliates for Storm's humiliation of her brother by shooting her in the head and leaving her to die. The Strucker twins despise Magneto for the role in their father's seeming death some years after World War II. They conduct acts of terrorism and finally attack Magneto during the trial in Paris by the International Court of Justice for crimes against humanity. The X-Men foil their assassination attempt, but Fenris manages to escape by allowing themselves to be swept into the old city sewers. The twins later resurface as part of a group of mutant millionaires who engage in a campaign of murder as part of a game organized by the mutant telepath the Gamesmaster and the Hellfire Club's former Black Queen Selene. The twins tried to acquire Omega Red for the Upstarts, but failed. The twins ultimately met their match when they tried to kill Wolfsbane of the New Mutants. Wolfsbane and the X-Factor team easily beat the twins.

The twins joined a conference of powerful criminal leaders who intended to divide up what's left by the Kingpin's fallen empire. Among the members of the conference were the Slug, Hammerhead, Tombstone and Werner von Strucker. The twins did not believe Werner was actually their sibling. This and other arguments caused the conference to degenerate into a shouting, shooting and blasting match. Fenris attempted to kill Hammerhead, but was rescued. Their sibling is soon after killed by their father attending the conference disguised as Werner's assistant. The twins resurfaced, where they were seen working with Baron Strucker. They fight Citizen V; however, Andrea discovers that Citizen V is actually Helmut Zemo's transferred mind in the real Citizen V's body by Techno after being decapitated by Nomad under Henry Peter Gyrich's orders. Zemo quickly kills Andrea to keep her from telling anyone the truth.

 
After Andrea's death, Zemo has the Purple Man brainwash Andreas into taking the alias of "Swordsman". The Purple Man has him flay the skin from Andrea's corpse to incorporate the resulting leather into his sword's hilt, allowing him to channel their shared powers through his sword. Andreas breaks free of the Purple Man's control and joins the Thunderbolts. Andreas continues to be a member under the Thunderbolts' new leadership. Teammate and current field leader Moonstone has approached Andreas with a reassurance. If he helps kill Songbird, Moonstone would be able to make a move to usurp Norman Osborn, the Thunderbolts' mentally fragile director. Thus, two factions seem to be forming amongst the Thunderbolts with Andreas and Moonstone on one side while Songbird and the Radioactive Man stand on the other. Despite his considerable skill, he has been defeated twice; the first is when Jack Flag hit him with the flat of his own sword and the second is when the Steel Spider threw him through a window and a flat-screen television using a metal limb.

Under the control of four imprisoned telepaths, Strucker has taken over the title of "Baron Strucker" and shaved his head in his father's honor. He has gained the loyalty of several guards by paying them well and ordered them to set off a bomb in the Zeus (the Thunderbolts' carrier) to initiate a lockdown. He declares to one of his guards that Osborn will bring him back his sister or everyone in Thunderbolts Mountain will be killed. After a detachment of guards kill most of his loyal guards, Strucker kills off the remaining attacking guards. He then encounters Venom declaring to eat Strucker. The two fight and Strucker runs Venom through with his sword, activating his energy powers while the sword is in Venom's body. Soon afterwards, Osborn snaps from the pressures of running the Thunderbolts and the Green Goblin brutally attacks Andreas, crucifying him to a wall with small Goblin-Daggers.

Not long afterward, it is discovered that Andreas used Arnim Zola to make a clone of his sister. Although Andreas has Andrea back, he wants to complete his Thunderbolts contract, leaving as a free man. In order to protect Andrea while on missions, Andreas skins his arm, giving the flesh to his sister's clone to hold and allowing her to use their shared powers. Andrea accompanies her brother and the Thunderbolts during the battle against the Skrulls and witnesses as Moonstone incapacitates Andreas and attempts to make a deal with the Skrulls. Andrea then attacks Moonstone. While she is preoccupied with Moonstone, Bullseye kills her from behind. Osborn later convinces Andreas that the Skrulls killed his sister's clone. Andreas also saves Songbird's life when Bullseye and Venom attempt to kill Songbird on Moonstone's orders. Andreas later confronts Osborn with the revelation that he wasn't offered a slot on the Dark Avengers, as well as never planning on resurrecting his sister or receiving a Presidential pardon; Osborn has a moment of insanity and stabs Andreas through the chest with his own sword, apparently killing him and throwing him out over the mountain.

Andrea's clone and Andreas have somehow returned to the land of the living and have opened "Club Fenris", a supervillain club in Manhattan. When questioned about their demise and subsequent return from the dead, they stated that their father "took care of it". They are also residents of the newly established mutant nation of Krakoa.

Powers and abilities
As a result of genetic engineering with their X-Genes when they were still in utero, Fenris are able to fly and generate energy blasts, but only when they are holding hands. When holding hands, Andreas can generate concussive force blasts while Andrea generates disintegration beams. The Swordsman uses various hidden blades; his primary sword blade is sheathed in an adamantium alloy and can shoot a grappling hook-like projectile. His sword's hilt is wrapped with Andrea's skin to release powerful bioelectric blasts of concussive force.

Other versions

House of M
During the House of M reality, Andrea and Andreas were seen assisting their father in a resistance against both mutants and the Kree. Both of them end up killed in action.

Ultimate Marvel
The Ultimate Marvel version of Andrea von Strucker and Andreas von Strucker are androgynous mutant twins that can generate heat blasts when they touch each other that seek mutant supremacy through economic control as German business tycoons. Co-Presidents of the global investment firm Fenris International, they are deeply involved in corporate crime to "end the economic domination of Homo sapiens" while masquerading as an honorable investment banking firm with offices in the Empire State Building.  It is also shown that they are lovers. They have dealings with Black Tom Cassidy and have tried to recruit Gambit and Rogue; Rogue rejected the offer and Gambit was already in their employ but rebelled to help Rogue escape. It is revealed that the twins are behind the recent Sentinel attacks with the creator of the first wave of mutant hunting robots. It has also been revealed that they are tied to the Mutant Liberation Front. As a result of their activities involving the Sentinels and the Mutant Liberation Front, the twins apparently killed during their battle with Bishop's X-Men team.

In other media

Television
Fenris appear in The Gifted, with Andreas von Strucker portrayed by Paul Cooper (younger) and Carsten Norgaard (older) and Andrea von Strucker portrayed by Caitlin Mehner (younger) and Julia Farino (older). Mutant terrorists active in the late 1940s and early 1950s, Andreas possesses destructive telekinesis while Andrea has molecular forcefield creation. Together, they can produce destructive light energy when in physical contact. Horrified by their actions, their nephew Otto Strucker runs away from them and manages to suppress the X-Gene after years of conducting research on his son Reed Strucker to prevent the threat from returning. However, Reed's children Lauren and Andy Strucker inherit Fenris' abilities.

Film
 Andrea von Strucker, as Viper, appears in Nick Fury: Agent of S.H.I.E.L.D., portrayed by Sandra Hess. This version was Werner von Strucker's half-sibling.
 Fenris were originally slated to appear in Dark Phoenix as members of the Hellfire Club, but were ultimately cut from the film.

Video games
Andreas von Strucker as the Swordsman appears in the PSP version of Marvel: Ultimate Alliance.

Bibliography
Citizen V and the V Battalion #1-3
Cloak & Dagger (vol. 3) #8-9
Excalibur #32-34
Gambit (vol. 3) #10
Generation X 1996
Quicksilver #8-9
Uncanny X-Men #194, 196, 200, 260, 268
X-Men Unlimited #1
X-Men (vol. 2) #4-7

References

Characters created by Chris Claremont
Characters created by John Romita Jr.
Comics characters introduced in 1985
Fictional characters involved in incest
Fictional swordfighters in comics
Twin characters in comics
Marvel Comics mutates
Marvel Comics supervillains
X-Men supporting characters
Marvel Comics neo-Nazis